The Forbes Midas list is the annual ranking by Forbes magazine of the most influential and best-performing venture capital investors. Described by Kara Swisher as the "Oscars for venture capitalists in tech,"  the Midas List uses parameters that include the first-day market capitalization of IPOs and the opinions of a panel of experts.

The name alludes to the mythological King Midas, renowned for his ability to turn anything he touched into gold. Forbes partnered with venture capital fund TrueBridge Capital Partners to create the list from 2011 to 2016.

Midas List Top 30, 2022
According to Forbes, the top 30 venture capitalists in 2022 are as follows:

References 

Venture capital
Private equity media and publications
Forbes lists
Lists of 21st-century people
Midas List